Kenichi Sawada (born December 13, 1975) is a Japanese mixed martial artist. He competed in the flyweight division.

Mixed martial arts record

|-
| Win
| align=center| 10-22-4
| Noriyuki Takei
| Decision (majority)
| Shooto: Torao 16
| 
| align=center| 2
| align=center| 5:00
| Tokyo, Japan
| 
|-
| Loss
| align=center| 9-22-4
| Takamasa Kiuchi
| Submission (Armbar)
| Zst: Zst 45
| 
| align=center| 1
| align=center| 1:29
| Tokyo, Japan
| 
|-
| Loss
| align=center| 9-21-4
| Junji Ito
| KO (Punches)
| Shooto: Gig Tokyo 18
| 
| align=center| 2
| align=center| 2:04
| Tokyo, Japan
| 
|-
| Loss
| align=center| 9-20-4
| Kaito Sakamaki
| Submission (Guillotine Choke)
| Zst: Zst 43
| 
| align=center| 1
| align=center| 3:08
| Tokyo, Japan
| 
|-
| Win
| align=center| 9-19-4
| Toru Sakakibara
| Decision (Majority)
| Zst: Zst 42
| 
| align=center| 2
| align=center| 5:00
| Tokyo, Japan
| 
|-
| Loss
| align=center| 8-19-4
| Yusuke Uehara
| Decision (Majority)
| Zst: Zst 40
| 
| align=center| 2
| align=center| 5:00
| Tokyo, Japan
| 
|-
| Loss
| align=center| 8-18-4
| Rambaa Somdet
| Decision (Unanimous)
| Grabaka: Grabaka Live! 3
| 
| align=center| 2
| align=center| 5:00
| Tokyo, Japan
| 
|-
| Win
| align=center| 8-17-4
| Ryota Uozumi
| Decision (Unanimous)
| Zst: Zst 36
| 
| align=center| 2
| align=center| 5:00
| Tokyo, Japan
| 
|-
| Loss
| align=center| 7-17-4
| Ryo Hatta
| Submission (Rear-Naked Choke)
| Zst: Zst 34
| 
| align=center| 1
| align=center| 4:38
| Tokyo, Japan
| 
|-
| Loss
| align=center| 7-16-4
| Akihito Sasao
| KO (Head Kick)
| Shooto: Border: Season 4: Third
| 
| align=center| 1
| align=center| 1:58
| Osaka, Kansai, Japan
| 
|-
| Loss
| align=center| 7-15-4
| Takafumi Ato
| Decision (Split)
| Shooto: Shooting Disco 19: Reborn
| 
| align=center| 3
| align=center| 5:00
| Tokyo, Japan
| 
|-
| Loss
| align=center| 7-14-4
| Yuichiro Yajima
| Submission (Arm-Triangle Choke)
| Rings: Battle Genesis Vol. 10
| 
| align=center| 1
| align=center| 3:01
| Tokyo, Japan
| 
|-
| Loss
| align=center| 7-13-4
| Jun Nakamura
| Submission (Armbar)
| Shooto: Gig Central 24: Love and Courage
| 
| align=center| 2
| align=center| 2:30
| Nagoya, Aichi, Japan
| 
|-
| Win
| align=center| 7-12-4
| Yuya Kaneuchi
| KO (Punch)
| Pancrase: Impressive Tour 11
| 
| align=center| 2
| align=center| 1:20
| Tokyo, Japan
| 
|-
| Loss
| align=center| 6-12-4
| Tadaaki Yamamoto
| Decision (Unanimous)
| Shooto: Gig Central 23
| 
| align=center| 2
| align=center| 5:00
| Nagoya, Aichi, Japan
| 
|-
| Win
| align=center| 6-11-4
| Jun Nabeshima
| TKO (Doctor Stoppage)
| Shooto: Kitazawa Shooto Vol. 4
| 
| align=center| 2
| align=center| 1:24
| Tokyo, Japan
| 
|-
| Win
| align=center| 5-11-4
| Shuichiro Okumura
| Decision (Unanimous)
| Shooto: Gig Saitama 2
| 
| align=center| 2
| align=center| 5:00
| Shiki, Saitama, Japan
| 
|-
| Loss
| align=center| 4-11-4
| Tatsuya Yamamoto
| TKO (Punches)
| Shooto: Gig North 5
| 
| align=center| 1
| align=center| 1:39
| Sapporo, Hokkaido, Japan
| 
|-
| Draw
| align=center| 4-10-4
| Keisuke Kurata
| Draw
| Shooto: Gig Central 19
| 
| align=center| 2
| align=center| 5:00
| Nagoya, Aichi, Japan
| 
|-
| Win
| align=center| 4-10-3
| Atsushi Mochizuki
| Decision (Unanimous)
| Shooto: Gig North 4
| 
| align=center| 2
| align=center| 5:00
| Sapporo, Hokkaido, Japan
| 
|-
| Loss
| align=center| 3-10-3
| Junji Ito
| Submission (Rear-Naked Choke)
| Shooto: Gig Tokyo 2
| 
| align=center| 2
| align=center| 0:47
| Tokyo, Japan
| 
|-
| Draw
| align=center| 3-9-3
| Teppei Masuda
| Draw
| Shooto: Gig Central 16
| 
| align=center| 2
| align=center| 5:00
| Nagoya, Aichi, Japan
| 
|-
| Loss
| align=center| 3-9-2
| Hiroyuki Abe
| Submission (Armbar)
| Shooto: 6/26 in Kitazawa Town Hall
| 
| align=center| 1
| align=center| 4:13
| Setagaya, Tokyo, Japan
| 
|-
| Loss
| align=center| 3-8-2
| Katsuya Murofushi
| Submission (Triangle Choke)
| Shooto: 3/21 in Kitazawa Town Hall
| 
| align=center| 1
| align=center| 1:53
| Setagaya, Tokyo, Japan
| 
|-
| Win
| align=center| 3-7-2
| Takehiro Ishii
| Decision (Unanimous)
| Shooto: Shooting Disco 3: Everybody Fight Now
| 
| align=center| 2
| align=center| 5:00
| Tokyo, Japan
| 
|-
| Draw
| align=center| 2-7-2
| Shinya Murofushi
| Draw
| Shooto: Back To Our Roots 3
| 
| align=center| 2
| align=center| 5:00
| Tokyo, Japan
| 
|-
| Loss
| align=center| 2-7-1
| Takehiro Harusaki
| Decision (Split)
| Shooto: Battle Mix Tokyo 2
| 
| align=center| 2
| align=center| 5:00
| Tokyo, Japan
| 
|-
| Loss
| align=center| 2-6-1
| Noboru Tahara
| TKO (Corner Stoppage)
| Shooto: 11/30 in Kitazawa Town Hall
| 
| align=center| 2
| align=center| 4:57
| Setagaya, Tokyo, Japan
| 
|-
| Win
| align=center| 2-5-1
| Tomohiko Yoshida
| Decision (Unanimous)
| Shooto: Gig Central 10
| 
| align=center| 2
| align=center| 5:00
| Shooto: Gig Central 10
| 
|-
| Win
| align=center| 1-5-1
| Hiroaki Takezawa
| Decision (Unanimous)
| Shooto 2005: 11/29 in Kitazawa Town Hall
| 
| align=center| 2
| align=center| 5:00
| Setagaya, Tokyo, Japan
| 
|-
| Loss
| align=center| 0-5-1
| Takehiro Ishii
| TKO (Swollen Eye)
| Shooto: 5/29 in Kitazawa Town Hall
| 
| align=center| 1
| align=center| 5:00
| Setagaya, Tokyo, Japan
| 
|-
| Loss
| align=center| 0-4-1
| Shinichi Kojima
| Technical Submission (Rear Naked Choke)
| Shooto: 7/16 in Korakuen Hall
| 
| align=center| 2
| align=center| 3:34
| Tokyo, Japan
| 
|-
| Loss
| align=center| 0-3-1
| Yutaka Tetsuka
| Decision (Unanimous)
| Shooto: 11/25 in Kitazawa Town Hall
| 
| align=center| 2
| align=center| 5:00
| Setagaya, Tokyo, Japan
| 
|-
| Draw
| align=center| 0-2-1
| Tetsuya Akihisa
| Draw
| Shooto: Gig West 4
| 
| align=center| 2
| align=center| 5:00
| Osaka, Kansai, Japan
| 
|-
| Loss
| align=center| 0-2
| Yasuhiro Akagi
| Decision (Majority)
| Shooto: Gig Central 3
| 
| align=center| 2
| align=center| 5:00
| Nagoya, Aichi, Japan
| 
|-
| Loss
| align=center| 0-1
| Keisuke Kurata
| Decision (Unanimous)
| Shooto: Gig Central 2
| 
| align=center| 2
| align=center| 5:00
| Nagoya, Aichi, Japan
|

See also
List of male mixed martial artists

References

External links
 

1975 births
Japanese male mixed martial artists
Flyweight mixed martial artists
Living people